Blean and Tyler Hill Halt was a minor station on the Canterbury and Whitstable Railway at Tyler Hill, Kent. It opened in 1908 and closed in 1931.

History
Blean and Tyler Hill Halt was opened on 1 January 1908, although it did not appear in the public timetable until 13 June. The halt closed on 1 January 1931, when passenger services ceased on the Canterbury and Whitstable Railway. The station was demolished after closure and the site is now on a driveway to a private house called "The Halt".

References
Citations

Sources
 
 

Disused railway stations in Kent
Former South Eastern Railway (UK) stations
Railway stations in Great Britain opened in 1908
Railway stations in Great Britain closed in 1931
Canterbury
1908 establishments in England
1931 disestablishments in England